Clifton Hill Moravian Church is a Moravian church in central Saint Thomas parish in Barbados. It was built by the Moravians who had previously settled on the island in 1839.

19th-century Protestant churches
Churches in Barbados
Congregations of the Eastern West Indies Province of the Moravian Church
Saint Thomas, Barbados
Religious buildings and structures in Barbados
Moravian churches in Barbados